Adrián Slančík (born 22 July 1999) is a Slovak professional footballer who currently plays for Pohronie, competing in the Fortuna Liga, as a goalkeeper.

Club career

1. FC Tatran Prešov
Slančík made his Fortuna Liga debut for Tatran Prešov at Pasienky against Slovan Bratislava on 22 October 2017. Despite being the underdogs in the match, Tatran only lost by a single goal - 2:3. Slančík conceded a goal from Hungarian international Dávid Holman and two more from Czech top scorer of Slovan Jakub Mareš.

FK Pohronie
After match-less spells in the top division at DAC and Senica, in the summer of 2021, Slančík returned to native central Slovakia to a town of Žiar nad Hronom, where he signed with Pohronie. While he remained benched in the first round fixture of the new season at Štadión Antona Malatinského against Spartak Trnava, due to an illness of the preferred goalkeeper Libor Hrdlička, Slančík had debuted in the second matchday on 31 July 2021. Pohronie won the home fixture against Zemplín Michalovce 2:0, via two first half goals by Ladji Mallé and Miloš Lačný. After the match, he described the match as difficult, applauding the field players for two early strikes and solid defensive work, while highlighting the need to improve the performance.

References

External links
 1. FC Tatran Prešov official club profile 
 FK Pohronie official club profile 
 
 
 Futbalnet profile 

1999 births
Living people
Sportspeople from Zvolen
Slovak footballers
Slovakia youth international footballers
Association football goalkeepers
1. FC Tatran Prešov players
FC DAC 1904 Dunajská Streda players
FK Senica players
FK Pohronie players
Slovak Super Liga players
2. Liga (Slovakia) players
FC ŠTK 1914 Šamorín players